Bird-Brain is a fictional character appearing in American comic books published by Marvel Comics.

Publication history
Bird-Brain first appeared in The New Mutants #55 (Sept. 1987), and was first fully seen in The New Mutants #56 (Oct. 1987). The character was created by Louise Simonson and June Brigman.

Fictional character biography
Bird-Brain is one of a number of "Ani-Mates", creatures created by an insane geneticist named the Ani-Mator, combining the characteristics of human beings and other animals. The Ani-Mator subjected his creations to a number of cruel and deadly experiments, but Bird-Brain escapes the Ani-Mator's island and befriends the New Mutants. They try to acclimate him to regular society, which fails miserably time and again, mainly because Bird-Brain would eat all the food he saw. For the most part, Bird-Brain is unable to communicate with the New Mutants, despite the language powers of the New Mutant Cypher, because of how simplistic Bird-Brain's language is. In his first conversation with Cypher, Bird-Brain explains that he has been trained with food by starving him and using food as a reward.

Bird-Brain develops relatively close relationships with Cypher (who is fascinated by Bird-Brain's language) and Wolfsbane for her changeling ability, through which he sees her as a kindred spirit, and her general kindness to him. Feeling he had abandoned the other mutated creatures on the island, Bird-Brain eventually returns with the New Mutants to free them. The Ani-Mator, attempting to shoot Wolfsbane, instead kills Cypher, and Magik exiles the Ani-Mator to the dimension of Limbo in retaliation. Once freed from the Ani-Mator's tyranny, Bird-Brain decides to remain on the island with the other Ani-Mates.

References

External links
Bird-Brain at the Marvel Database Project
Bird-Brain at UncannyXmen.net

Characters created by Louise Simonson
Comics characters introduced in 1987
Marvel Comics mutates
Marvel Comics superheroes
New Mutants